Step(s) or STEP may refer to:

Common meanings
 Steps, making a staircase
 Walking
 Dance move
 Military step, or march
 Marching

Arts

Films and television
 Steps (TV series), Hong Kong
 Step (film), US, 2017

Literature
 Steps (novel), by Jerzy Kosinski
 Systematic Training for Effective Parenting, a book series

Music
 Step (music), pitch change
 Steps (pop group), UK
 Step (Kara album), 2011, South Korea
 "Step" (Kara song)
 Step (Meg album), 2007, Japan
 "Step" (Vampire Weekend song)
 "Step" (ClariS song)

Organizations
 Society of Trust and Estate Practitioners, international professional body for advisers who specialise in inheritance and succession planning
 Board on Science, Technology, and Economic Policy of the U.S. National Academies
 Solving the E-waste Problem, a UN organization

Science, technology, and mathematics
 Step (software), a physics simulator in KDE
 Step function, in mathematics
 Striatal-enriched protein tyrosine phosphatase, an enzyme
 Serial transverse enteroplasty, a surgical procedure
 Spherical Tokamak for Energy Production, a UK nuclear fusion project
 STEP (satellite), to test general relativity
 STEP Library, a Bible software format
 ISO 10303 (.STEP), a CAD data-exchange file format standard
 Sustainable Transport Energy for Perth, a fuel cell bus program in Western Australia
 Staggered extension process, in molecular biology

Rural localities

Belarus 
 Step, Gomel Region, a settlement

Russia 
 Step, Belgorod Oblast, a khutor
 Step, Gostomlyansky Selsoviet, Medvensky District, Kursk Oblast, a khutor
 Step (khutor), Vyshnereutchansky Selsoviet, Medvensky District, Kursk Oblast, a khutor
 Step (selo), Vyshnereutchansky Selsoviet, Medvensky District, Kursk Oblast, a selo
 Step, Ponyrovsky District, Kursk Oblast, a village
 Step, Zolotukhinsky District, Kursk Oblast, a khutor
 Step, Zabaykalsky Krai, a settlement

Ukraine 
 Step, Borzna Raion, Chernihiv Oblast, a selo
 Step, Nizhyn Raion, Chernihiv Oblast, a selo
 Step, Talalaivka Raion, Chernihiv Oblast, a selo
 Step, Dnipropetrovsk Oblast, a selo
 Step, Khmelnytskyi Oblast, a selo

Other uses
 Edward Step (1855–1931), nature writer
 Step (unit), a Roman unit of length
 Step (air base), Chita, Russia
 Step aerobics
 Step dance, a style
 Stepfamily, with a stepmother or stepfather
 STEP (company), Belgium
 STEP Bible, a Bible study tool
 STEPS, an acronym representing the principle testimonies in Quaker practical theology
 Sixth Term Examination Paper, UK
 Smart Traveler Enrollment Program, for US travelers

See also
 
 Stepping (disambiguation)
 Steppe
 Footstep (disambiguation)